Peter Cvjetanovic (also known as Peter Cytanovic; born 1996) is an American former white supremacist known for being photographed at the Unite the Right rally in 2017.

He has worked as a driver for the University of Nevada and was dismissed from the Nevada National Guard in 2021 after background checks revealed his history of extremism.

In 2019, Cvjetanovic told journalist Charlotte McDonald-Gibson that he had rejected white supremacy and was volunteering with a counter-extremism organization.

Earlier life 
Cvjetanovic was born in Reno, Nevada in 1996. His father worked at a casino; his mother received a brain cancer diagnosis during pregnancy. He grew up in a household that he described as impoverished and Catholic.

Cvjetanovic graduated from North Valleys High School in Reno, in 2014. He studied history and political science for four years at the University of Nevada, Reno.

Activism and views 
In 2017, Cvjetanovic was a white nationalist and a member of Identity Evropa, a group that the Southern Poverty Law Center has labeled as a hate group. A photograph of Cvjetanovic and Teddy Joseph Von Nukem holding a tiki torches at the Unite the Right rally became the image that was most commonly used to represent the 2017 right-wing protest in Charlottesville, Virginia. A Boston Globe opinion piece by media studies professor Aniko Bodroghkozy described Cvjetanovic has sporting a "Hitler Youth haircut" in the photograph. 

Cvjetanovic resigned as a driver at University of Nevada in 2017, while continuing his studies there. Earlier, the university declined to terminate his employment, despite public pressure to do so, citing Cvjetanovic's right to freedom of expression.

During a 2017 interview on local television about his role in the rally, Cvjetanovic denied being racist, but also spoke of “the slow replacement of white heritage in the United States” and described the Confederate general Robert E. Lee as someone that he “wanted to honour [for] what he stood for during his time”. Cvjetanovic described the far-left and Antifa as "just as dangerous, if not more dangerous than the right wing could ever be." Cvjetanovic reported receiving five credible death threats after the photograph went viral on social media.

In 2019, Cvjetanovic was studying for a master's degree in political theory at the London School of Economics while volunteering for Groundswell, a counter-extremism organisation.

He is one of eight people featured in Charlotte McDonald-Gibson's 2022 book Far Out: Encounters with Extremists.

Career 
Cvjetanovic worked as a Specialist at the Nevada National Guard from November 22, 2019 until being fired just over one year later, after background checks highlighted his extremism.

Since 2019, he has struggled to find employment due to his infamy.

References 

Living people
1996 births
American white supremacists
Chauffeurs
Nevada National Guard personnel
North Valleys High School alumni
People from Reno, Nevada
University of Nevada, Reno alumni
University of Nevada, Reno people